The 2021–22 Taichung Wagor Suns season was the franchise's 1st season, its first season in the T1 League, its 1st in Taichung City. The Suns are coached by Iurgi Caminos in his first year as head coach.

Draft 

 Reference：

Standings

Roster 

<noinclude>

Game log

Preseason

Regular season

Regular season note 
 Due to the COVID-19 pandemic in Taoyuan, the Taoyuan City Government and Taoyuan Leopards declared that the games at the Chung Yuan Christian University Gymnasium would play behind closed doors since January 15 to 16.
 Due to the COVID-19 pandemic in Taiwan, the T1 League declared that the game on February 6 would postpone to April 29. And the games at the Kaohsiung Arena would play behind closed doors since January 28 to 30.
 Due to the COVID-19 pandemic in Taiwan, the T1 League declared that the game on April 3 would postpone to May 8.
 Due to the COVID-19 pandemic in Taiwan, the T1 League declared that the games at the University of Taipei Tianmu Campus Gymnasium would play behind closed doors since April 4 to 10.
 Due to the Taoyuan Leopards cannot reach the minimum player number, the T1 League declared that the game on May 8 would postpone to May 20.

Semifinals

Finals

Player Statistics 
<noinclude>

Regular season

Semifinals

Finals

 Reference：

Transactions 
On January 8, 2022, Taichung Wagor Suns indicated that Alonzo Gee went back to the United States for taking care of his grandmother.

On October 7, 2021, Donté Greene signed with Taichung Wagor Suns. On March 23, 2022, Donté Greene was not registered in the 2021–22 T1 League season final rosters.

Trades

Free agents

Additions

Awards

Yearly Awards

MVP of the Month

Import of the Month

References 

2021–22 T1 League season by team
Taichung Wagor Suns seasons